The 1942 Wyoming Cowboys football team represented the University of Wyoming in the Mountain States Conference (MSC) during the 1942 college football season.  In its second season under head coach Bunny Oakes, the team compiled a 3–5 record (1–5 against MSC opponents) and was outscored by a total of 115 to 106.

Schedule

References

Wyoming
Wyoming Cowboys football seasons
Wyoming Cowboys football